Alexander Nanau (born 18 May 1979) is an Oscar-nominated German/Romanian film director, film producer and screenwriter.

Biography 
Alexander Nanau was born on 18 May 1979, in Bucharest, Romania. He has lived in Germany since 1990. 

Nanau studied directing at the German Academy of Film and Television in Berlin (DFFB) and was the holder of two scholarships, one at the Sundance Institute, and another at the Akademie der Künste in Berlin.

Career 
In 2007, he founded the Alexander Nanau Production production house in Romania. His documentary, The World According to Ion B., won the 2010 International Emmy Award in the "Arts Programming" category.  

His documentary Toto and His Sisters was nominated for the European Film Awards of the European Film Academy in 2015. The latter was distributed internationally and shown at festivals around the world. Nanau was the cinematographer for the French-German documentary Nothingwood, filmed in Afghanistan, which premiered at Cannes in 2017 in the Directors' Fortnight section. 

His documentary Collective won the Best Documentary category at the 2020 European Film Awards. It became the first Romanian film nominated for the Academy Award for Best International Feature Film, as well as a nomination for Best Documentary.

Filmography

References

External links 
 

1979 births
Living people
German film directors
German film producers
German screenwriters
German male screenwriters
Romanian emigrants to Germany
Romanian film directors
Film people from Bucharest